Whiteout is the second EP by American recording artist Dawn Richard. It was released on December1, 2012.

Track listing

References

Dawn Richard (singer) EPs
2012 EPs